Alexandre Tégar (born 12 August 2000) is a French professional footballer who plays as a left-back for  club Paris 13 Atletico.

Honours 
Dijon B
 Championnat National 3: 2018–19

References

External links 
 

2000 births
Living people
People from Les Abymes
Guadeloupean footballers
French footballers
French people of Guadeloupean descent
Association football fullbacks
Dijon FCO players
US Quevilly-Rouen Métropole players
Paris 13 Atletico players
Championnat National 3 players
Ligue 2 players
Championnat National players